During the 1992–93 English football season, Torquay United F.C. competed in the Third Division. Torquay had in fact been relegated from the third division the previous season, but, due to rebranding of the leagues following the formation of the FA Premier League, the old Fourth Division had been renamed the third.

Kit
Torquay retained the previous season's kit, manufactured by Matchwinner and sponsored by Mod-Dec Windows.

Squad
Squad at end of season

Left club during season

Transfers

In
 Tom Kelly - Exeter City, January, free

Out
 Paul Holmes - Birmingham City
 Paul Hall - Portsmouth, 25 March, £70,000

Results

Third Division
Crewe Alexandra 4–2 Torquay United

Doncaster Rovers 2–3 Torquay United

York City 2–1 Torquay United

Torquay United 2–1 Cardiff City

Scarborough 1–0 Torquay United

Torquay United 1–1 Wrexham

Torquay United 1–0 Northampton Town

Bury 2–0 Torquay United

Darlington 4–1 Torquay United

Torquay United 2–2 Chesterfield

Hereford United 3–1 Torquay United

Torquay United 0–2 Carlisle United

Gillingham 0–2 Torquay United

Torquay United 0–2 Rochdale

Halifax Town 0–2 Torquay United

Torquay United 0–1 Scunthorpe United

Colchester United 2–0 Torquay United

Torquay United 1–0 Shrewsbury Town

Torquay United 0–1 Walsall

Barnet 5–4 Torquay United

Torquay United 1–3 Scarborough

Wrexham 4–2 Torquay United

Torquay United 0–1 Bury

Northampton Town 0–1 Torquay United

Torquay United 1–2 Doncaster Rovers

Torquay United 1–2 Crewe Alexandra

Cardiff City 4–0 Torquay United

Torquay United 1–0 York City

Chesterfield 1–0 Torquay United

Torquay United 0–2 Darlington

Lincoln City 2–2 Torquay United

Torquay United 2–0 Halifax Town

Rochdale 1–0 Torquay United

Scunthorpe United 2–2 Torquay United

Torquay United 2–2 Colchester United

Walsall 2–2 Torquay United

Torquay United 0–1 Barnet

Shrewsbury Town 0–1 Torquay United

Torquay United 1–2 Lincoln City

Torquay United 0–0 Hereford United

Carlisle United 0–1 Torquay United

Torquay United 2–1 Gillingham

References

Torquay United F.C. seasons
Torquay United F.C.